A gas mask is a mask used to protect the wearer from inhaling airborne pollutants and toxic gases. The mask forms a sealed cover over the nose and mouth, but may also cover the eyes and other vulnerable soft tissues of the face. Most gas masks are also respirators, though the word gas mask is often used to refer to military equipment (such as a field protective mask), the scope used in this article. The gas mask only protects the user from digesting, inhaling, and contact through the eyes (many agents affect through eye contact). Most combined gas mask filters will last around 8 hours in a biological or chemical situation. Filters against specific chemical agents can last up to 20 hours.

Airborne toxic materials may be gaseous (for example, chlorine or mustard gas), or particulates (such as biological agents). Many filters provide protection from both types.

The first gas masks mostly used circular lenses made of glass, mica or cellulose acetate to allow vision. Glass and mica were quite brittle and needed frequent replacement. The later Triplex lens style (a cellulose acetate lens sandwiched between glass ones) became more popular, and alongside plain cellulose acetate they became the standard into the 1930s. Panoramic lenses were not popular until the 1930s, but there are some examples of those being used even during the war (Austro-Hungarian 15M). Later, stronger polycarbonate came into use.

Some masks have one or two compact air filter containers screwed onto inlets, while others have a large air filtration container connected to the gas mask via a hose that is sometimes confused with an air-supplied respirator in which an alternate supply of fresh air (oxygen tanks) is delivered.

Principles of construction
Absorption is the process of being drawn into a (usually larger) body or substrate, and adsorption is the process of deposition upon a surface. This can be used to remove both particulate and gaseous hazards. Although some form of reaction may take place, it is not necessary; the method may work by attractive charges. For example, if the target particles are positively charged, a negatively charged substrate may be used. Examples of substrates include activated carbon, and zeolites. This effect can be very simple and highly effective, for example using a damp cloth to cover the mouth and nose while escaping a fire. While this method can be effective at trapping particulates produced by combustion, it does not filter out harmful gases which may be toxic or which displace the oxygen required for survival.

Safety of old gas masks
Gas masks have a useful lifespan limited by the absorbent capacity of the filter. Filters cease to provide protection when saturated with hazardous chemicals, and degrade over time even if sealed. Most gas masks have sealing caps over the air intake and are stored in vacuum-sealed bags to prevent the filter from degrading due to exposure to humidity and pollutants in normal air. Unused gas mask filters from World War II may not protect the wearer at all, and could be harmful if worn due to long-term changes in the chemical composition of the filter.

Some World War II and Soviet Cold War gas masks contained chrysotile asbestos or crocidolite asbestos in their filters, not known to be harmful at the time. It is not reliably known for how long the materials were used in filters. 

Typically, masks using 40 mm connections are a more recent design. Rubber degrades with time, so boxed unused "modern type" masks can be cracked and leak. The US C2 canister (black) contains hexavalent chromium; studies by the U.S. Army Chemical Corps found that the level in the filter was acceptable, but suggest caution when using, as it is a carcinogen.

Modern filter classification 

The filter is selected according to the toxic compound. Each filter type protects against a particular hazard and is color-coded:

Particle filters are often included, because in many cases the hazardous materials are in the form of mist, which can be captured by the particle filter before entering the chemical adsorber. In Europe and jurisdictions with similar rules such as Russia and Australia, filter types are given suffix numbers to indicate their capacity. For non-particle hazards, the level "1" is assumed and a number "2" is used to indicate a better level. For particles (P), three levels are always given with the number. In the US, only the particle part is further classified by NIOSH air filtration ratings.

A filter type that can protect against multiple hazards is notated with the European symbols concatenated with each other. Examples include ABEK, ABEK-P3, and ABEK-HgP3. A2B2E2K2-P3 is the highest rating of filter available. An entirely different "multi/CBRN" filter class with an olive color is used in the US.

Filtration may be aided with an air pump to improve wearer comfort. Filtration of air is only possible if there is sufficient oxygen in the first place. Thus, when handling asphyxiants, or when ventilation is poor or the hazards are unknown, filtration is not possible and air must be supplied (with a SCBA system) from a pressurized bottle as in scuba diving.

Use 

A modern mask typically is constructed of an elastic polymer in various sizes. It is fitted with various adjustable straps which may be tightened to secure a good fit. Crucially, it is connected to a filter cartridge near the mouth either directly, or via a flexible hose. Some models contain drinking tubes which may be connected to a water bottle. Corrective lens inserts are also available for users who require them.

Masks are typically tested for fit before use. After a mask is fitted, it is often tested by various challenge agents. Isoamyl acetate, a synthetic banana flavourant, and camphor are often used as innocuous challenge agents. In the military, teargases such as CN, CS, and stannic chloride in a chamber may be used to give the users confidence in the efficacy of the mask.

Shortcomings 
The protection of a gas mask comes with some disadvantages. The wearer of a typical gas mask must exert extra effort to breathe, and some of the exhaled air is re-inhaled due to the dead space between the facepiece and the user's face. The exposure to carbon dioxide may exceed its OELs (0.5% by volume/9 grammes per cubic metre for an eight-hour shift; 1.4%/27 grammes per m3 for 15 minutes' exposure) by a factor of many times: for gas masks and elastomeric respirators, up to 2.6%); and in case of long-term use, headache, dermatitis and acne may appear. The UK HSE textbook recommends limiting the use of respirators without air supply (that is, not PAPR) to one hour.

Reaction and exchange

This principle relies on substances harmful to humans being usually more reactive than air. This method of separation will use some form of generally reactive substance (for example an acid) coating or supported by some solid material. An example is synthetic resins. These can be created with different groups of atoms (usually called functional groups) that have different properties. Thus a resin can be tailored to a particular toxic group. When the reactive substance comes in contact with the resin, it will bond to it, removing it from the air stream. It may also exchange with a less harmful substance at this site.

Though it was crude, the hypo helmet was a stopgap measure for British troops in the trenches that offered at least some protection during a gas attack. As the months passed and poison gas was used more often, more sophisticated gas masks were developed and introduced. There are two main difficulties with gas mask design:

The user may be exposed to many types of toxic material. Military personnel are especially prone to being exposed to a diverse range of toxic gases. However, if the mask is for a particular use (such as the protection from a specific toxic material in a factory), then the design can be much simpler and the cost lower.
The protection will wear off over time. Filters will clog up, substrates for absorption will fill up, and reactive filters will run out of reactive substances. Thus the user only has protection for a limited time, and then they must either replace the filter device in the mask, or use a new mask.

History and development

Early breathing devices
According to Popular Mechanics, "The common sponge was used in ancient Greece as a gas mask..." In 1785, Jean-François Pilâtre de Rozier invented a respirator.

Primitive respirator examples were used by miners and introduced by Alexander von Humboldt in 1799, when he worked as a mining engineer in Prussia. The forerunner to the modern gas mask was invented in 1847 by Lewis P. Haslett, a device that contained elements that allowed breathing through a nose and mouthpiece, inhalation of air through a bulb-shaped filter, and a vent to exhale air back into the atmosphere. First Facts states that a "gas mask resembling the modern type" was patented by Lewis Phectic Haslett of Louisville, Kentucky, who received a patent on June 12, 1849. U.S. patent #6,529 issued to Haslett, described the first "Inhaler or Lung Protector" that filtered dust from the air.

Early versions were constructed by the Scottish chemist John Stenhouse in 1854 and the physicist John Tyndall in the 1870s. Another early design was the "Safety Hood and Smoke Protector" invented by Garrett Morgan in 1912, and patented in 1914. It was a simple device consisting of a cotton hood with two hoses which hung down to the floor, allowing the wearer to breathe the safer air found there. In addition, moist sponges were inserted at the end of the hoses in order to better filter the air. This was later modified to include its own air supply, leading to World War I era gas masks.

First World War

The First World War brought about the first need for mass-produced gas masks on both sides because of extensive use of chemical weapons. The German army successfully used poison gas for the first time against Allied troops at the Second Battle of Ypres, Belgium on April 22, 1915. An immediate response was cotton wool wrapped in muslin, issued to the troops by May 1. This was followed by the Black Veil Respirator, invented by John Scott Haldane, which was a cotton pad soaked in an absorbent solution which was secured over the mouth using black cotton veiling.

Seeking to improve on the Black Veil respirator, Cluny MacPherson created a mask made of chemical-absorbing fabric which fitted over the entire head. A  canvas hood treated with chlorine-absorbing chemicals, and fitted with a transparent mica eyepiece. Macpherson presented his idea to the British War Office Anti-Gas Department on May 10, 1915; prototypes were developed soon after. The design was adopted by the British Army and introduced as the British Smoke Hood in June 1915; Macpherson was appointed to the War Office Committee for Protection against Poisonous Gases. More elaborate sorbent compounds were added later to further iterations of his helmet (PH helmet), to defeat other respiratory poison gases used such as phosgene, diphosgene and chloropicrin. In summer and autumn 1915, Edward Harrison, Bertram Lambert and John Sadd developed the Large Box Respirator. This canister gas mask had a tin can containing the absorbent materials by a hose and began to be issued in February 1916. A compact version, the Small Box Respirator, was made a universal issue from August 1916.

In the first gas masks of World War I, it was initially found that wood charcoal was a good absorbent of poison gases. Around 1918, it was found that charcoals made from the shells and seeds of various fruits and nuts such as coconuts, chestnuts, horse-chestnuts, and peach stones performed much better than wood charcoal. These waste materials were collected from the public in recycling programs to assist the war effort.

The first effective filtering activated charcoal gas mask in the world was invented in 1915 by Russian chemist Nikolay Zelinsky.

Also in World War I, since dogs were frequently used on the front lines, a special type of gas mask was developed that dogs were trained to wear. Other gas masks were developed during World War I and the time following for horses in the various mounted units that operated near the front lines. In America, thousands of gas masks were produced for American as well as Allied troops. Mine Safety Appliances was a chief producer. This mask was later used widely in industry.

Second World War

The British Respirator, Anti-Gas (Light) was developed in 1943 by the British. It was made of plastic and rubber-like material that greatly reduced the weight and bulk compared to World War I gas masks, and fitted the user's face more snugly and comfortably. The main improvement was replacing the separate filter canister connected with a hose by an easily replaceable filter canister screwed on the side of the gas mask. Also, it had replaceable plastic lenses.

Modern mask 
Gas mask development since has mirrored the development of chemical agents in warfare, filling the need to protect against ever more deadly threats, biological weapons, and radioactive dust in the nuclear era. However, for agents that cause harm through contact or penetration of the skin, such as blister agent or nerve agent, a gas mask alone is not sufficient protection, and full protective clothing must be worn in addition to protect from contact with the atmosphere. For reasons of civil defence and personal protection, individuals often buy gas masks since they believe that they protect against the harmful effects of an attack with nuclear, biological, or chemical (NBC) agents, which is only partially true, as gas masks protect only against respiratory absorption. Most military gas masks are designed to be capable of protecting against all NBC agents, but they can have filter canisters proof against those agents (heavier) or only against riot control agents and smoke (lighter and often used for training purposes). There are lightweight masks solely for protection against riot-control agents and not for NBC situations.

Although thorough training and the availability of gas masks and other protective equipment can nullify the casualty-causing effects of an attack by chemical agents, troops who are forced to operate in full protective gear are less efficient in completing tasks, tire easily, and may be affected psychologically by the threat of attack by those weapons. During the Cold War, it was seen as inevitable that there would be a constant NBC threat on the battlefield and so troops needed protection in which they could remain fully functional; thus, protective gear and especially gas masks have evolved to incorporate innovations in terms of increasing user comfort and compatibility with other equipment (from drinking devices to artificial respiration tubes, to communications systems etc.).

During the Iran–Iraq War (1980–88), Iraq developed its chemical weapons program with the help of European countries such as Germany and France and used them in a large scale against Iranians and Iraqi Kurds. Iran was unprepared for chemical warfare. In 1984, Iran received gas masks from the Republic of Korea and East Germany, but the Korean masks were not suited for the faces of non-East Asian people, the filter lasted for only 15 minutes, and the 5,000 masks bought from East Germany proved to be not gas masks but spray-painting goggles. As late as 1986, Iranian diplomats still travelled in Europe to buy active charcoal and models of filters to produce defensive gear domestically. In April 1988, Iran started domestic production of gas masks by the Iran Yasa factories.

In schools

Many civilians learned how to use gas masks through the civil defense department, but children received most gas mask education in school drills. Schools would implement gas mask education and training after the outbreak of a war. Schools would harshly enforce the compulsory carrying of gas masks at all times. Gas mask and air raid drills were closely related and children would be made to wear gas masks in everyday activities, including gymnastics. The wearing of gas masks in the classrooms were especially difficult for teachers as they had trouble distinguishing one child from another. The gas masks became as uniform as the students' uniforms. Other civilians learned the use of a gas mask through posters, pamphlets, and radio lectures, but children learned through cartoons and rhymes such as "coughs and sneezes spread diseases".

See also
 Assigned Protection Factors
 Cartridges and canisters of air-purifying respirators
 GP-5 gas mask
 Hopcalite
 M2 Gas Mask
 M40 Field Protective Mask
 M50 joint service general purpose mask
 C-4 Protective Mask
 NBC suit
 PH helmet
 Plague doctor's outfit
 Respirator
 Respirator fit test
 Respirators testing in the workplaces
 Respirator assigned protection factors
 Smoke hood

Notes

Bibliography

External links

How Stuff Works - Gas Masks Science.com
The History of Gas Masks  inventors.about.com, About, Inc. updated August 6, 2016
Respirator Fact Sheet
CBRN SCBA NIOSH Approved Respirators List of NIOSH Approved CBRN SCBA respirators

American inventions
British inventions
Iranian inventions
Russian inventions
Science and technology in the United Kingdom
Military personal equipment
1914 introductions
Riot control equipment
Main